Yelland is  a village in North Devon, England.

Yelland may also refer to:
 Ely Airport or Yelland Field, an airport in Ely, Nevada, United States
 Yelland Stone Rows, an ancient double row of megalithic standing stones in Devon

People with the surname
 David Yelland (journalist) (born 1963), English journalist and newspaper editor
 David Yelland (actor), British actor
 Hannah Yelland (born 1976), British actress
 Herbert Yelland (1878–1962), Australian politician
 Lewis Yelland Andrews (died 1937), British district commissioner for Galilee (assassinated)